The Miami Sol were a professional women's basketball team that was based in Miami and entered the Women's National Basketball Association (WNBA) in 2000. They played their games at American Airlines Arena as the sister team to the Miami Heat of the National Basketball Association (NBA). The team folded after the 2002 season because of financial problems.

History
The city of Miami was granted one of the first four expansion teams of the WNBA in June 1999 along with Indianapolis, Seattle, and Portland. In their short history, the Miami Sol was coached for three seasons by Ron Rothstein. For their inaugural 2000 season, the Sol finished in sixth place in the Eastern Conference with an overall record of 13–19.

Players such as Debbie Black, Elena Baranova, Sandy Brondello, Ruth Riley, and Sheri Sam led them to a 20–12 record and a trip to the playoffs in 2001, but lost in the first round to the New York Liberty in three games, the only playoff appearance in franchise history. After losing to the New York Liberty in the playoffs, the Miami Sol finished the 2002 season with a 15–17 record.

That season proved to be the Sol's last. Citing the inability to raise enough funds to continue operation under the WNBA's new restructuring agreement, the organization ceased operations in November 2002. The team formally folded in January 2003 after the WNBA announced players from both the Sol and Portland Fire would be placed in a spring dispersal draft. The team finished with a .500 franchise record of 48 wins and 48 losses.  The other Florida team, the Orlando Miracle, ceased operations after the 2002 season and was relocated to Connecticut as the Connecticut Sun, adopting a nickname and logo very similar to the Miami Sol.

After the team's folding, its players found success elsewhere in the league. After being reassigned to the Detroit Shock, Ruth Riley won two WNBA championships in 2003 and 2006. Betty Lennox and Sandy Brondello won a WNBA championship with the Seattle Storm in 2004, with Lennox winning the WNBA Finals Most Valuable Player award.

Uniforms
The Sol's road uniforms were fiery red, with the team name emblazoned in white on the chest and a WNBA ball in place of the hole in the letter "O". The home jerseys featured the same design, only with the colors inverted.

Name
The team's nickname, Sol, is Spanish and Portuguese for "sun" and was unveiled on January 7, 2000. The name played off the Miami area's large Hispanic population and its "brother" NBA team, the Miami Heat.

Season-by-season records

Notable players
Marlies Askamp
Elena Baranova
Sandy Brondello
Katrina Colleton
Debbie Black
Milena Flores
Pollyanna Johns-Kimbrough
Betty Lennox
Carolyn Moos
Vanessa Nygaard
Kristen Rasmussen
Ruth Riley
Sheri Sam
Iziane Castro Marques

Coaches and others
Head coaches:
Ron Rothstein (2000–02)

General Managers:
Ron Rothstein (2000–02)

Assistant coaches
Tony Fiorentino (2000–02)
Jenny Boucek (2000–02)

TV Production
Marc Brody (2000–02)

References

Defunct Women's National Basketball Association teams
Basketball teams established in 2000
Basketball teams disestablished in 2002
Basketball teams in Miami
2000 establishments in Florida
2002 disestablishments in Florida
Basketball teams in Florida